Vallespir ( or) is a historical Catalan comarca in Northern Catalonia, part of the French  department of Pyrénées-Orientales. 
The capital of the comarca is Ceret, and it borders Conflent, Rosselló, Alt Empordà, Garrotxa and Ripollès. It lies in the Tech River valley. The main towns in the Vallespir are Ceret, Amelie Les Bains, Arles Sur Tech and Prats De Mollo La Preste.

External links 
 El Vallespir in Catalan Encyclopaedia.
 photos66.free.fr Virtual Photography Céret.

Geography of Pyrénées-Orientales
Linguistic rights
Occitanie region articles needing translation from French Wikipedia